Church of the Redeemer, built in 1908, was a historic church located at 20th and Atlantic Avenues in the borough of Longport in Atlantic County, New Jersey, United States. The building was added to the National Register of Historic Places on September 10, 1992, for its significance in art. health/medicine and religion.  It suffered a catastrophic fire in June 2012, and was demolished. A re-creation of the church is under construction and scheduled to open in June 2014.

History and description
Designed by the firm of Duhring, Okie & Ziegler, the building likely was the work of architect H. Louis Duhring, Jr. Duhring's father was a prominent Episcopal minister in Philadelphia, Pennsylvania, and a friend of Joseph P. Remington, the donor of the land for the church.

It was heavily damaged in a fire on June 30, 2012.  The fire was thought to be started when the church was struck by lightning from a storm connected with the June 2012 North American derecho severe-weather event.  The surviving structure was deemed unsafe and demolished on July 2, 2012.

See also
 National Register of Historic Places listings in Atlantic County, New Jersey

References

Churches on the National Register of Historic Places in New Jersey
Churches completed in 1908
20th-century Episcopal church buildings
Churches in Atlantic County, New Jersey
Longport, New Jersey
National Register of Historic Places in Atlantic County, New Jersey
New Jersey Register of Historic Places
Episcopal church buildings in New Jersey
1908 establishments in New Jersey
Rebuilt buildings and structures in the United States
Church fires in the United States
Mission Revival architecture in New Jersey